This article is a timeline of the history of the city of Cleveland, Ohio, USA.

18th century
 1796 - Moses Cleaveland and survey party arrive at the location that would later become Cleveland.
 1797 - Lorenzo Carter, a prominent early settler, arrives.

19th century
 1800 - Trumbull County created, encompassing Cleveland.
 1803 - Ohio becomes the 17th State admitted to the Union.
 1805 - Geauga County created, encompassing Cleveland.
 1808 - Lorenzo Carter builds the Zephyr, the first ship to be launched in Cleveland.
 1810 - Cuyahoga County organized; Cleveland selected as county seat. 
 1813 - Oliver Hazard Perry wins the Battle of Lake Erie at Put-in-Bay in the War of 1812.
 1814
 Cleveland receives its charter as a village.
 Newburgh Township created.
 1815
 Alfred Kelley is elected the first president of the village of Cleveland.
 Euclid Avenue commissioned, subsequently known as Millionaires' Row.
 1818 - The Cleveland Gazette and Commercial Register, Cleveland's first newspaper is published.
 1822 - A free bridge is opened across the Cuyahoga River.
 1827 - Opening of the Ohio canal as far as Akron.
 1830 - Population: 1,076.
 1831
 The Cleveland Advertiser alters the spelling of the community's name to Cleveland.
 James A. Garfield, 20th United States President, born in Orange Township.
 1832 - Ohio and Erie Canal completed to the Ohio River.
 1836
 Cleveland and Ohio City are incorporated as cities.
 John W. Willey is elected the first mayor of Cleveland.
 Bridge War between Cleveland and Ohio City takes place.
 1837 - Cleveland City Council votes to create City Hospital, now MetroHealth.
 1840 - Population: 6,071.
 1842 - The Plain Dealer begins publication.
 1844 - Samuel Starkweather elected mayor.
 1845 - City Bank of Cleveland (forerunner of National City Corp.) founded.
 1847
 The Weddell House opens.
 The first telegraph line (from Cleveland to Pittsburgh) is completed.
 1848 - Colored National Convention held in city.
 1850
 William Case elected mayor.
 Population: 17,034.
 1851 - Cleveland, Columbus and Cincinnati Railroad completed.
 1852 -  The Aliened American newspaper begins publication.
 1853
 The Cleveland Theater opens.
 National Women's Rights Convention held.
 Woodland Cemetery established.
 1854
 Ohio City annexed to Cleveland.
 William B. Castle elected mayor.
 The Cleveland Leader begins publication.
 1860
 Perry Monument on Public Square dedicated.
 Population: 43,417.
 1861
 Abraham Lincoln visits Cleveland.
 The American Civil War begins.
 1865
 The American Civil War ends.
 Thousands of Clevelanders mourn the death of Lincoln.
 1866 - Cleveland Police Department established.
 1869
 Cleveland Public Library established.
 Lake View Cemetery opens.
 1870
 Standard Oil Company in business.
 Population: 92,829.
 1873
 Cleveland Bar Association established.
 Newburgh annexed to Cleveland.
 1874 - First Woman's National Temperance Convention held in Cleveland, establishing the Woman's Christian Temperance Union.
 1875 - Euclid Avenue Opera House opens.
 1876
 Charles F. Brush patents an electric generator.
 Riverside Cemetery Chapel & Riverside Cemetery Gatehouse built.
 1878 - Penny Press, predecessor to the Cleveland Press, begins publication.
 1880
 James A. Garfield, from Cleveland, elected 20th President of the United States.
 Case School of Applied Science established.
 Population: 160,146. 
 1881
 Garfield lies in state on Public Square after being assassinated, July 2.
 Adelbert Hall built.
 1882
 Western Reserve College moves to Cleveland.
 Cleveland School of Art established.
 1883 - John H. Farley elected mayor.
 1884
 First electric streetcar run in the city.
 Cleveland Electric Light Co. formed.
 1887 - Michelson–Morley experiment conducted at Western Reserve University.
 1890
 The Arcade opens.
 Garfield Monument dedicated in Lake View Cemetery.
 Population: 261,353.
 1894
 May Day Riots of 1894
 Soldiers and Sailors Monument dedicated.
 1895 - Robert E. McKisson elected mayor.
 1896 - Cleveland celebrates its centennial.
 1897 - Bohemian National Hall built.
 1899
 Cleveland streetcar strike.
 John H. Farley re-elected mayor.
 1900 - Population: 381,768.

20th century

1900s-1940s
 1901
 Tom L. Johnson elected mayor.
 The Cleveland Blues (predecessor to the Cleveland Indians) are established as one of the first teams in the new American League.
 Cleveland worker and avowed anarchist, Leon Czolgosz assassinates U.S. President William McKinley in Buffalo, New York.
 1905
 The Cleveland News begins publication
 Glenville and South Brooklyn annexed to Cleveland.
 1908
 Collinwood School Fire
 More Streetcar strikes but less violent and unsuccessful.
 1909
 Tom L. Johnson loses mayoral race to Herman C. Baehr.
 Corlett Village annexed to Cleveland.
 1910
 Collinwood annexed to Cleveland.
 Cleveland Railway Company operated from 1910 to 1942. 
 Population: 560,663. 
 1911
 Tom L. Johnson dies.
 Church of the Covenant established.
 1912 - Village of Nottingham annexed to Cleveland.
 1913
 The Great Lakes Storm of 1913 hits Cleveland.
 Home Rule City Charter approved by Cleveland voters.
 Cleveland Museum of Art established.
 Metropolitan Theatre opened.
 The first Community Chest, "Community Fund", founded in Cleveland.
 1914
 Cleveland chosen as the Fourth District headquarters of the Federal Reserve Bank.
 Cleveland Municipal Light Plant goes into operation.
 1915 - Cleveland Play House and Western Reserve University's School of Applied Social Science established.
 1916
 Cleveland Museum of Art opens.
 Cleveland City Hall dedicated.
 1917 - Cleveland Metroparks organized.
 1918
 Federal Court trial of Eugene V. Debs held in Cleveland.
 Detroit–Superior Bridge construvtion completed.
 1919
 May Day Riots of 1919
 State Prohibition is enacted in Cleveland
 Voters approve placement of a new railroad terminal on Public Square.
 1920
 Cleveland Institute of Music founded.
 Cleveland becomes the fifth-largest city in the nation.
 The Volstead Act and the Eighteenth Amendment become law.
 Cleveland Indians win the World Series.
 Cleveland Museum of Natural History established.
 Population: 796,841.
 1921
 Cleveland Clinic and Playhouse Square established.
 KeyBank State Theatre built.
 Mimi Ohio Theatre opened.
 Hanna Theatre opened.
 1922 - Demolition for the Terminal Tower site begins
 1923
 Federal Reserve bank building completed.
 Alcazar Hotel completed.
 1924
 Republican National Convention held in Cleveland.
 Mayor/Council form of government replaced by City Manager plan.
 1925
 New Public Library building opens.
 Cleveland Airport (now Hopkins International) opens.
 University Hospitals incorporated.
 1929
 Cleveland Clinic disaster occurs.
 National Air Race first held in Cleveland.
 The Stock Market crashes
 1930 - The Tower City Center is dedicated.
 1931
 Severance Hall dedicated.
 City Manager system reverts to the Mayor/Council form of government.
 Ray T. Miller elected mayor.
 1932 - Hope Memorial Bridge construction completed.
 1933
 Harry L. Davis returns as mayor.
 Depression-era unemployment peaks in Cleveland: nearly one-third of the city's citizens are out of work.
 Prohibition is repealed on December 23 – nearly eight months longer than the Eighteenth Amendment.
 1935
 Harold Hitz Burton elected mayor.
 Eliot Ness becomes Safety Director of Cleveland.
 1936 - Republican National Convention held in Cleveland.
 1937
 Cleveland Barons hockey team established.
 Cleveland Arena opens.
 Cleveland Rams begin to play professional football.
 John D. Rockefeller dies.
 1938
 Cleveland Memorial Shoreway opens between East 9th Street and Gordon Park.
 Clevelander Jesse Owens wins four gold medals at Berlin Olympic Games.
 Great Lakes Exposition opens.
 Cleveland Torso Murderer with up to 20 victims.
 1939 - Main Avenue Bridge opened.
 1940 - NACA, forerunner of NASA, established at the Cleveland airport.
 1941
 Frank Lausche elected mayor.
 Western Reserve Red Cats win the Sun Bowl, the city's first college football bowl game.
 1942 - Cleveland Bomber Plant (now the I-X Center) opens at Municipal Airport.
 1944 - Cleveland East Ohio Gas Explosion claims 130 lives.
 1945
 Thomas A. Burke elected mayor.
 Cleveland Rams win NFL football title then move to Los Angeles.
 1946
 Cleveland Browns are founded and begin play in All-America Football Conference.
 Cleveland Browns win the All-America Football Conference championship.
 1947
 Operations begin at the lakefront airport.
 First telecast by WEWS, Ohio's first television station.
 Eliot Ness runs for mayor of Cleveland but is defeated by incumbent Thomas A. Burke.
 Cleveland Browns win the All-America Football Conference championship.
 1948
 Cleveland Indians win World Series.
 Cleveland Browns win the All-America Football Conference championship.
 1949
 Cleveland named an All-America City for first time.
 Cleveland Browns win the All-America Football Conference championship.

1950s-1990s
 1950
 Cleveland Browns begin play in National Football League.
 Cleveland Browns win the National Football League championship.
 1953 - Anthony J. Celebrezze elected mayor.
 1954
 Last streetcars run.
 Cleveland Browns win the National Football League championship.
 1955
 Rapid Transit begins operation.
 Cleveland Browns win the National Football League championship.
 1959 - Boddie Recording Company in business.
 1960
 Erieview urban renewal plan unveiled.
 Final issue of the Cleveland News published.
 1961 - Mapp v. Ohio
 1962
 Ralph S. Locher elected mayor.
 Innerbelt Freeway opens for its full length.
 1964
 Erieview Tower completed.
 Cleveland State University established.
 Cleveland Browns win the National Football League championship.
 1965 - WVIZ, an educational television station, begins broadcasting.
 1966
 Hough Riots
 Cuyahoga Community College opens its Metro Campus.
 1967
 Carl B. Stokes elected the first African American mayor of a major American city.
 Case Western Reserve University established.
 1968
 Glenville Shootout
 Terry v. Ohio
 1969
 A burning oil slick on the Cuyahoga River attracts national attention regarding pollution.
 Euclid Beach Park closes.
 1970 - Cleveland Cavaliers basketball team organized.
 1972 - Cleveland Magazine begins publication.
 1973 - Cleveland Barons play their last hockey game.
 1974 - Greater Cleveland Regional Transit Authority established.
 1976 - Desegregation of the Cleveland Public Schools ordered by U.S. District Judge Frank J. Battisti.
 1977 - Dennis Kucinich elected mayor.
 1978
 Cleveland is hit by the Great Blizzard of 1978
 1978 recall election
 December 15, Cleveland becomes the first American city to go into default since the Depression.
 1979
 George Voinovich elected mayor.
 Greater Cleveland Food Bank established.
 1980 - Presidential debate between candidates Jimmy Carter and Ronald Reagan held in Cleveland.
 1981
 Cleveland Public Theatre opened.
 City Council reduced from 33 to 21 members.
 Term of office for mayor and council members increased from two to four years.
 1982
 Ground broken for the Sohio (BP) Building on Public Square.
 The Cleveland Press ceases publication.
 Cleveland named an All-America City for second time.
 1984 - Cleveland named an All-America City for third time.
 1986
 Cleveland named an All-America City for fourth time.
 Cleveland selected as site for Rock and Roll Hall of Fame.
 1987 - Cleveland emerges from default.
 1988 - Cleveland Neighborhood Progress and Case Western Reserve University's Center on Urban Poverty and Social Change established.
 1989 - Michael R. White elected mayor.
 1991 - Key Tower "topped off" at 947 ft (289 m).
 1993 - Cleveland named an All-America City for fifth time.
 1995
 Rock and Roll Hall of Fame and Museum opens.
 Indians win American League championship.
 Bishop Anthony Pilla is elected to the presidency of USCCB
 1996
 Cleveland celebrates its bicentennial.
 Cleveland rap group Bone Thugs-n-Harmony win a Grammy for "Tha Crossroads"
 1997 - Cleveland Indians win the American League pennant and return to the World Series.
 1999 - The new Cleveland Browns Stadium opens with the return of the Cleveland Browns.

21st century
 2001 - Cleveland Barons are revived.
 2002 - Cleveland citizens elect Jane L. Campbell as the first female mayor of Cleveland.
 2003 - 2003 North America blackout
 2004 - Vice-presidential candidates Dick Cheney and John Edwards debate at Case Western Reserve University.
 2005 - Frank G. Jackson is the first sitting city councillor to be elected mayor since Stephen Buhrer in 1867.
 2006
 Barons leave Cleveland for the second time.
 Cleveland, Columbus, and other Ohio cities argue against a bill passed by the Ohio House legislature that will eliminate residency rules.
 2007
 Cleveland is hit with a major winter storm in February, leaving 15 inches of snow.
 October 20, Cleveland became the first television market in the United States to have all of its local television stations to broadcast in high definition.
 2008 - Cuyahoga County federal corruption investigation.
 2009
 The Ohio Supreme Court upholds the 2006 law prohibiting residency requirements.
 Frank Jackson wins a second term as Mayor of Cleveland.
 November, Ohio Voters open Ohio to casino gambling and Cleveland will have a casino by 2013.
 Cleveland is selected by the International Gay Games committee to host the 2014 Gay Games. Cleveland beat out Boston, Washington DC, and Hamburg Germany.
 2010 - Population: 396,815.
 2011 - Construction begins on the Medical Mart and new convention center, scheduled to open late 2013.
 2013 - Frank Jackson wins a third term as Mayor of Cleveland against Kenneth Lanci.
 2014
 Shooting of Tamir Rice
 Hosts the international 2014 Gay Games, also known as Gay Games 9
 2015 - Chief U.S. District Judge Solomon Oliver Jr. signs consent decree for the Cleveland Division of Police.
 2016
 Cleveland Cavaliers win the NBA Championship.
 Lake Erie Monsters win the Calder Cup and then are renamed Cleveland Monsters.
 Republican National Convention held in Cleveland.
 The Cleveland Indians face the Chicago Cubs in the 2016 World Series.
 2017 - Frank Jackson wins a fourth term as Mayor of Cleveland, becoming the city's longest-serving mayor.
 2018 - Cleveland's population begins to flatten as Downtown population increases.
 2019
 The Beacon completed in Downtown Cleveland.
 Cuyahoga River named "River of the Year" by the American Rivers conservation association.
 2020
 Population: 372,624.
 The COVID-19 pandemic in Ohio begins when Ohio Governor Mike DeWine reports the earliest cases of the virus to be in Cuyahoga County.
 George Floyd protests take place in Cleveland and most major U.S. cities.
 The Lumen tower completed in Downtown Cleveland.
 Case Western Reserve University and the Cleveland Clinic host the first 2020 U.S. presidential debate at the Health Education Campus (HEC).
 2021
 2021 NFL Draft held in Cleveland at FirstEnergy Stadium.
 Frank Jackson announces that he will not pursue a fifth term as mayor.
 The Cleveland Indians assume the name the Cleveland Guardians.
 Justin Bibb elected mayor.

See also
 History of Cleveland
 Bibliography of Cleveland

Other cities in Ohio
 Timeline of Cincinnati
 Timeline of Columbus, Ohio
 Timeline of Toledo, Ohio

References

External links
 
Cleveland History Timeline, The Encyclopedia of Cleveland History (Case Western Reserve University)
 
 
 
 

Timeline
Cleveland
Cleveland-related lists
Years in Ohio